Luna Island is the partly ice-covered rocky island in the southwest part of Biscoe Islands, Antarctica, 637 m long in southwest-northeast direction and 165 m wide, and comprising two parts divided by a passage narrowing to 5 m. Its surface area is 6.55 ha.

The feature is named after Ines Luna Aguilar from the Chilean city of Punta Arenas for her logistic support for the Bulgarian Antarctic programme.

Location
British mapping in 1976.

Maps
 British Antarctic Territory. Scale 1:200000 topographic map. DOS 610 Series, Sheet W 66 66. Directorate of Overseas Surveys, UK, 1976
 Antarctic Digital Database (ADD). Scale 1:250000 topographic map of Antarctica. Scientific Committee on Antarctic Research (SCAR). Since 1993, regularly upgraded and updated

See also
 List of Antarctic and subantarctic islands

Notes

References
 Bulgarian Antarctic Gazetteer. Antarctic Place-names Commission. (details in Bulgarian, basic data in English)

External links
 Luna Island. Adjusted Copernix satellite image

Islands of the Biscoe Islands
Bulgaria and the Antarctic